Herminio Ahumada (7 October 1899 – 1 July 1983) was a Mexican politician and former sprinter who competed in the 1924 Summer Olympics. He later served as a federal deputy in the XXXIX Legislature of the Mexican Congress, where he was the President of the Chamber of Deputies in 1944.

After earning a law degree from the National Autonomous University of Mexico, Ahumada worked as a judge in Sonora Superior Tribunals of Justice in Sonora and the Federal District.

Personal life
Ahumada married Carmen Vasconcelos, daughter of José Vasconcelos. Their son, Felipe Ahumada Vasconcelos, married Celia Castillo Peraza, sister of Carlos Castillo Peraza.

References

External links
 

1899 births
1983 deaths
Mexican male sprinters
Olympic athletes of Mexico
Athletes (track and field) at the 1924 Summer Olympics
Sportspeople from Sonora
Central American and Caribbean Games gold medalists for Mexico
Competitors at the 1926 Central American and Caribbean Games
Mexican sportsperson-politicians
People from Soyopa Municipality
Central American and Caribbean Games medalists in athletics
Politicians from Sonora
Presidents of the Chamber of Deputies (Mexico)
Members of the Chamber of Deputies (Mexico)
20th-century Mexican politicians
20th-century Mexican lawyers
Mexican judges
National Autonomous University of Mexico alumni
Academic staff of the National Autonomous University of Mexico